The Statute of the Permanent Court of International Justice was an international treaty concluded in Geneva on 13 December 1920 by representatives of 46 states, most of which came from the Allied Powers of the First World War. It was registered in League of Nations Treaty Series on October 8, 1921. It brought the Permanent Court of International Justice into existence.

Clauses
The statute consisted of 64 articles.

Article 1 stated that the Court is established in conformity with article 14 of the Covenant of the League of Nations, and its function shall not contradict the operation of the Permanent Court of Arbitration or any other special arbitration tribunals. 

Article 2 stipulated that the Court shall consist of independent judges, elected regardless of nationality.

Article 3 fixed the number of judges at 11, plus 4 deputy-judges.

Article 4 provided for election of judges by the League Assembly and Council from lists of candidates delivered by the candidates' national governments.

Ratifications

Notes

Aftermath of World War I
Permanent Court of International Justice
Treaties concluded in 1920
Treaties entered into force in 1921